Caryocolum albithoracellum is a moth of the family Gelechiidae. It is found in Turkey (Anatolia).

The length of the forewings is about 5 mm. Adults have been recorded on wing from July to September.

References

Moths described in 1989
albithoracellum
Moths of Asia